At the Edge of Things is a 1915 American silent short drama film starring  Jack Richardson, Louise Lester, Vivian Rich, Harry von Meter and David Lythgoe.

External links

1915 films
1915 drama films
Silent American drama films
American silent short films
American black-and-white films
1915 short films
1910s American films
American drama short films
1910s English-language films